The Commonwealth Industrial Court, known as the Australian Industrial Court from 1973, was a specialist court to deal with industrial matters, principally the enforcement of awards and orders of the Commonwealth Conciliation and Arbitration Commission. Over time it took on more matters and its judges were allocated a wide range of judicial tasks until it was replaced in 1977 by the Federal Court of Australia which had a more general jurisdiction covering matters arising under Australian federal law.

Background

From 1904 until 1956 the Commonwealth Court of Conciliation and Arbitration had exercised both arbitration functions, hearing and settling interstate industrial disputes by making awards, and judicial functions such as interpreting and enforcing those awards. In the Boilermaker's case, the High Court held that a tribunal could not create new rights such as making an award, the arbitration function, and enforce those rights, the judicial function, due to the separation of powers in the Australian Constitution. The functions of the court were split, with the judicial functions being given to the newly created Commonwealth Industrial Court and the arbitration functions being given to the Commonwealth Conciliation and Arbitration Commission. The six remaining judges, were similarly split with two judges, Edward Dunphy and Sir Edward Morgan, being appointed to the Commonwealth Industrial Court and four, Sir Richard Kirby, Alfred Foster, Sydney Wright and Richard Ashburner being appointed to the Commonwealth Conciliation and Arbitration Commission.

Establishment and operation
The Australian Government challenged the High Court's decision in the Boilermaker's case and obtained special leave to appeal to the Privy Council on 1 June 1956. The Australian parliament did not wait for the outcome of the appeal, passing the Conciliation and Arbitration Act which received assent on 30 June 1956. The court was formally established on 15 August 1956 and then Attorney-General John Spicer was appointed the first, and as it transpired, only, Chief Judge. Judges of the Commonwealth Court of Conciliation and Arbitration had previously been appointed to act in various courts, This practice continued with appointments to the supreme courts of the Australian Capital Territory, Christmas, Cocos (Keeling), & Norfolk Islands. Sir John Spicer was appointed to the first Royal Commission into the collision between HMAS Melbourne and HMAS Voyager, and inquiries into the aviation crashes of TAA Flight 538 (1960), Ansett-ANA Flight 325 (1961) and Ansett-ANA Flight 149 (1966). Judges were also appointed to committees to review legislation and report to parliament, such as the appointment of Sir John Spicer to the Copyright Law Review Committee, and John Kerr to the Commonwealth Administrative Review Committee.  The Copyright Law Review Committee subsequently recommended the appointment of the Copyright Tribunal and Sir John Spicer was appointed as its president. When the Australian Parliament passed the Trade Practices Act in 1965, the Commonwealth Industrial Court was given power to enforce orders of the Trade Practices Tribunal, and Sir Richard Eggleston was appointed the first president of the Trade Practices Tribunal. In 1976 when the Administrative Appeals Tribunal was established appeals were to the Australian Industrial Court, adding yet another non-industrial matter to the Court's jurisdiction, and Gerard Brennan was appointed as the first President of the Administrative Appeals Tribunal.

Replacement by Federal Court

The establishment of a federal court was proposed at least as early as 1957, and was announced by Nigel Bowen, the Attorney-General, in 1967. Bowen said that a Commonwealth superior court was necessary because the burden of work in the High Court's original jurisdiction might limit its capacity to perform its primary roles of interpreting the Constitution and as the court of ultimate appeal.. It was however another 9 years until the Federal Court was established, absorbing the jurisdiction of the Australian Industrial Court, the Federal Court of Bankruptcy and some of the original jurisdiction of the High Court, including appeals from the supreme courts of the territories.

It was initially announced that no judge would be appointed over the age of 65, When judges were appointed to the Federal Court on 1 February 1977, two judges over the age of 65 were appointed, Sir Reginald Smithers then aged 73 and Sir John Nimmo, then aged 68.  Two judges of the Australian Industrial Court were not appointed to the Federal Court, Sir Percy Joske, then aged 81 and Edward Dunphy, then aged 69. The Constitutional amendment to section 72, which introduced a retirement age of 70, did not come in to force until 29 July 1977.

The last judge Ray Northrop retired in 1998 however the court was not formally abolished until 2004.

Judges

References

Courts of Australia
Former Commonwealth of Australia courts and tribunals
1956 establishments in Australia
2004 disestablishments in Australia
Courts and tribunals established in 1956
Courts and tribunals disestablished in 2004